(born 16 May 1929, in Tokyo, Japan) is a Japanese manga artist. She began her professional career as an illustrator of books in 1949. She switched to creating manga after reading Osamu Tezuka's works, debuting in 1952 with Namida no Sanbika. She quickly became the most popular female manga artist of her time.

She was noted in the 1960s for using pastel colors instead of the bright primary colors common at the time, and for pioneering both shōjo (written for teenage girls) horror stories with Blue Foxfire and shōjo mystery stories with Glass no Shiro (Glass Castle). In 1971, she received the Shogakukan Manga Award for Glass no Shiro and Sei Rosalindo. In the 1980s, she turned from shōjo to sexually explicit redisu-josei (written for adult women) with such series as Kinpeibai, which is based on a 19th-century Chinese erotic novel.

References

External links
 Profile at The Ultimate Manga Guide

Manga artists from Tokyo
Japanese female comics artists
Female comics writers
1929 births
Living people
People from Tokyo
Japanese women writers